In mathematics, a Beauville surface is one of the  surfaces of general type introduced by . They are examples of "fake quadrics", with the same Betti numbers as quadric surfaces.

Construction
Let C1 and C2 be smooth curves with genera g1 and g2.
Let G be a finite group acting on C1 and C2 such that
G has order (g1 − 1)(g2 − 1)
No nontrivial element of G has a fixed point on both C1 and C2
C1/G and C2/G are both rational.

Then the quotient (C1 × C2)/G is a Beauville surface.

One example is to take C1 and C2 both copies of the genus 6 quintic
X5 + Y5 + Z5 =0, and G to be an elementary abelian group of order 25, with suitable actions on the two curves.

Invariants
Hodge diamond:

References

Algebraic surfaces
Complex surfaces